The 2020–21 Northwestern State Demons basketball team represented Northwestern State University in the 2020–21 NCAA Division I men's basketball season. The Demons, led by 22nd-year head coach Mike McConathy, played their home games at Prather Coliseum in Natchitoches, Louisiana as members of the Southland Conference.

Previous season
The Demons finished the 2019–20 season 15–15, 11–9 in Southland play to finish in a tie for fourth place. They defeated Texas A&M–Corpus Christi in the first round of the Southland tournament and were set to take on Sam Houston State in the second round until the tournament was cancelled amid the COVID-19 pandemic.

Roster

Schedule and results

|-
!colspan=12 style=| Non-conference Regular season

|-
!colspan=12 style=| Southland Regular season

|-
!colspan=12 style=| Southland tournament
|-

Source

References

Northwestern State Demons basketball seasons
Northwestern State Demons
Northwestern State Demons basketball
Northwestern State Demons basketball